The Men's Javelin Throw event at the 1952 Summer Olympics took place on 24 July at the Helsinki Olympic Stadium.

Medalists

Records

Results

Qualifying round

Qualification: Qualifying Performance 64.00 advance to the Final.

Final

References

External links
Official Olympic Report, la84.org.

Athletics at the 1952 Summer Olympics
Javelin throw at the Olympics
Men's events at the 1952 Summer Olympics